Frances Adams Le Sueur née Ross (6 August 1919 – 17 May 1995) was a botanist, ornithologist, and conservationist on the Channel Island of Jersey. Her interest in ornithology began due to her extensive birdwatching. She also began to study the plants in Jersey, leading her to meet T.W. Attenborough, a senior pharmacist who provided invaluable knowledge of Jersey's flora that later helped her career. She did most of her work at her local natural science society, Société Jersiaise. She was key to the ornithology section of Société Jersiaise, and also key to documenting various flora of the Jersey area in her book Flora of Jersey (1985). Along with her research work, Le Sueur worked hard for conservation of Jersey's flower population, campaigning to keep their flora alive to the planning authorities of the Jersey area.

Le Sueur undertook research on the specimens collected in Jersey in the herbarium of the Canadian-French priest Frère Louis-Arsène.

Her work made her an honorary member of the Société Jersiaise, and a study centre in Saint Ouen's Bay is named in her honour.

References

20th-century British botanists
British ornithologists
British conservationists
Women botanists
Women ornithologists
Women conservationists
1919 births
1995 deaths
Jersey people
20th-century British zoologists
20th-century British women scientists